The Order of Druids (OD) is a fraternal and benefit organisation founded in England, in 1858 after a schism with the United Ancient Order of Druids. Its motto is integritas pro rupe nobis.

History
The order's emblem is a Druid with a harp and a Celtic warrior with the national emblems of United Kingdom, Australia, India and the United States. 

During the Victorian era, the most important section was the Sheffield Equalized Independent Druids. 

Between the two World Wars, this society was one of the three main Druidic fraternal societies in the British empire. It was very implanted in Sheffield and in the coalfields of England. After World War II and the generalization of the welfare state, it faded, and the last lodges closed during the 1970s.

See also
Friendly society
Druidry (modern)
Ancient Order of Druids
United Ancient Order of Druids

References

Bibliography
Ronald Hutton, Blood and Mistletoe: The History of the Druids in Britain, New Haven, Yale University Press, 2009.
Victoria Solt Dennis, Friendly and Fraternal Societies: their badges and regalia, London, 2008, p. 107.

Fraternal orders
Friendly societies of the United Kingdom
Neo-druid orders
Neo-druidism in Britain
Secret societies in the United Kingdom